This is a list of anime series by episode count, with television series of at least 100 episodes, OVA series of at least 20 episodes and ONA series of at least 20 episodes.

Televised series

This is a list of anime television series by episode count for series with a minimum of 100 episodes. Note that anime franchises with multiple television series (e.g. Pretty Cure) will be listed on this page. However, anime in Japan has a practice of naming seasons under their own separate title instead of by cours (e.g. K-On! versus K-On!! etc.). This article will only cover series without distinct season names.

Original video animation 
This is a list of original video animation (OVA) series by episode count for series with a minimum of 20 episodes.

Original net animation 
This is a list of original net animation (ONA) series by episode count for series with a minimum of 20 episodes.

See also
List of animated television series by episode count
List of manga series by volume count
Lists of television programs by episode count

Notes

References 

Episode count

Anime by episode count